The following outline is provided as an overview of and topical guide to evolution:

In biology, evolution is change in the heritable characteristics of biological organisms over generations due to natural selection, mutation, gene flow, and genetic drift.  Also known as descent with modification. Over time these evolutionary processes lead to formation of new species (speciation), changes within lineages (anagenesis), and loss of species (extinction). "Evolution" is also another name for evolutionary biology, the subfield of biology concerned with studying evolutionary processes that produced the diversity of life on Earth.

Fundamentals about evolution

Introduction

Basic principles
 
 
 Natural speciation
 
 
 
 
 Artificial speciation

Subfields

History
 
 
 
 
 
 By period or event
 
 
 
 
 
 
 
 
 
 
 By field

Evolutionary theory and modelling

See also Basic principles (above)

Population genetics

 
 Process
 
 
 
 
 
 
 
 
 
 
 
 
 Variation
 
 
 
 
 Key concepts
 
 
 
  
 
 
 
 
 
 
 
 Effects of selection
 
 
 Related topics

Evolutionary phenomena

Modelling

Taxonomy, systematics, and phylogeny

Fundamentals

Basic concepts of phylogenetics

Inference methods
 
 
 Probabilistic methods

Current topics

Group Traits

Group Types

Evolution of biodiversity

Origin and evolutionary history of life

Evolution of organisms

Evolution of tetrapods

Evolution of other animals

Evolution of plants

Evolution of other taxa

Evolution of cells, organs, and systems

Evolution of molecules and genes

Evolution of behaviour

Evolution of other processes
 
 
 
 
 
 
 
 
 s

Applications in other disciplines

Evolutionary issues

Controversy about evolution

Religious and philosophical views of evolution

Influence of evolutionary theory 
 
 See also Applications in other disciplines

Publications and organizations concerning evolution

Books
 Evolution: The Modern Synthesis – book by Julian Huxley (grandson of Thomas Henry Huxley); one of the most important books of modern evolutionary synthesis, published in 1942
 The Genetical Theory of Natural Selection – book by R.A. Fisher important in modern evolutionary synthesis, first published in 1930
 Genetics and the Origin of Species – 1937 book by Ukrainian-American evolutionary biologist Theodosius Dobzhansky
 On the Origin of Species – seminal book by Charles Darwin concerning evolution by natural selection, first published in 1859
 Systematics and the Origin of Species from the Viewpoint of a Zoologist – book by zoologist and evolutionary biologist Ernst Mayr, canonical publication of modern evolutionary synthesis, first published in 1942 by Columbia University Press
 The Structure of Evolutionary Theory – technical book on macroevolutionary theory by the Harvard paleontologist Stephen Jay Gould

Journals

Organizations

Evolution scholars and researchers

Prominent evolutionary biologists

See also

External links

General information
 
 
 
 
 
 Human Timeline (Interactive) – Smithsonian, National Museum of Natural History (August 2016).

Experiments concerning the process of biological evolution
 
 Algorithms, games, and evolution, Proceedings of the National Academy of Sciences of the USA

Online lectures
 
 

Evolution
Evolution